Lake Eşen or Eşen Pond is a lake in Turkey.

It is surrounded by red pine forests. In 1995, together with surrounding  area it was declared a picnic area. The main fish of the lake is carp.

References

Esen
Geography of Denizli Province
1995 establishments in Turkey
Beyağaç district